The R-class submarines were a class of United States Navy submarines active from 1918 until 1945. With the first of the class laid down following the American entry into World War I, they were built rapidly. Although R-15 through R-20 were completed July–October 1918, they did not serve overseas, and the bulk of the class were not completed until after the Armistice.

Design
Group 1 The R-1 through R-20 boats, designed by Electric Boat and built by Fore River Shipyard and Union Iron Works, were known as the R-1-class submarines. These single-hull boats were structurally very similar to the preceding O class, but larger and therefore with more powerful machinery to maintain the required speed. For the first time in a US submarine class, 21 inch (533 mm) torpedo tubes were fitted, a tube diameter that is still standard worldwide. A more powerful fixed 3-inch (76 mm)/50 caliber deck gun replaced the retractable 3-inch/23 caliber gun found on previous classes.

Group 2 R-21 to R-27, which were slightly smaller and faster than the R-1s, were designed and built by Lake Torpedo Boat Co. and are sometimes regarded as a separate class, the R-21 class. Compared with the Lake-designed O-class group, these featured a double hull and had their diving planes more conventionally positioned fore and aft, but retained the Lake O-class' characteristic wide stern and 18 inch (450 mm) torpedo tubes. They were equipped with the same 3-inch/50 deck gun as the Group 1 boats. Their smaller size compared with Group 1 allowed Lake to repeat the machinery of their O-class boats, which probably resulted in cost savings. Some Group 2 boats were fitted with a bow fairing to improve reserve buoyancy. This probably housed expanded ballast tanks. Unlike the Group 1 boats, most of which survived to serve in World War II, the Group 2 boats were scrapped in 1930 as part of the Navy's compliance with the London Naval Treaty. The Lake company's demise in 1924 and the obsolescent 18-inch torpedo armament probably also contributed to this.

Service
The Group 1 boats were decommissioned in 1931, but were recommissioned in 1940, patrolling in the Caribbean or being used as sonar targets at Key West, Florida, also patrolling between Submarine Base New London, Connecticut and Bermuda. At least two R-boats unsuccessfully fired torpedoes at German U-boats on the Bermuda patrols. P.514 was lost on 21 June 1942 in a collision with the Canadian minesweeper  due to being mistaken for a U-boat. R-12 was lost on 12 June 1943 in an accident off Key West.

At some point between the wars the US R class were modified for improved rescue ability in the event of sinking. A motor room hatch was added, the motor room being the aftermost compartment. The tapered after casing became a step as a result of this modification.

At least one R-class submarine can be seen briefly in the 1943 movie Crash Dive, filmed at the New London submarine base.

Electric Boat built four R-class boats for the Peruvian Navy (R-1 to R-4). Built after World War I using materials assembled from cancelled S-class submarines, they were refitted in 1935–36 and 1955–56, and renamed Islay, Casma, Pacocha, and Arica in 1957. They were discarded in 1960.

In December 2020, the remains of R-8 were discovered off the coast of Ocean City, Maryland.  The vessel sank there in 1936, after being used for target practice by bombers.

Ships in class
The 27 submarines of the R class were:

References

Notes

Sources
 https://web.archive.org/web/20140322093118/http://www.fleetsubmarine.com/sublist.html
 Gardiner, Robert, Conway's All the World's Fighting Ships 1906–1921 Conway Maritime Press, 1985. .
 
 Navsource.org early diesel submarines page
 Pigboats.com R-boats page
 DiGiulian, Tony Navweaps.com early 3"/50 caliber guns

External links

Submarine classes
 
 R class
 R class